Munvvar Saleem (born 10 July 1959) is a Member of the Parliament of India representing Uttar Pradesh for the Samajwadi Party in the Rajya Sabha, the upper house of the Indian Parliament.

He is a resident of Vidisha from Madhya Pradesh.

References

Living people
Samajwadi Party politicians
Rajya Sabha members from Uttar Pradesh
1959 births
People from Vidisha
Samajwadi Party politicians from Uttar Pradesh